Clear Linux OS is a Linux distribution, developed and maintained on Intel's 01.org open-source platform, and optimized for Intel's microprocessors with an emphasis on performance and security. Its optimizations also affect  AMD-systems. Clear Linux OS follows a rolling release model. Clear Linux OS is not intended to be a general-purpose Linux distribution; it is designed to be used by IT professionals for DevOps, AI application development, cloud computing, and containers.

History 
In 2015, Intel introduced Clear Linux OS at OpenStack Summit 2015, Vancouver initially, it was limited to cloud usage. Intel began the Clear Containers project to address container security. In 2015, originally, Clear Linux OS was deployed as a single monolithic unit. In May 2019, Clear Linux OS released a new Desktop Installer and started a Help Forum.

Clear Linux OS is available via Microsoft Azure marketplace, and Amazon Web Services marketplace.

Requirements 
Clear Linux OS supports 2nd generation Intel Core (Sandy Bridge) CPUs and later, Xeon E3 and later, and Silvermont-based Intel Atom C2000 and E3800 processors. An installed system is booted via the EFI boot loader or via systemd-boot. Minimum system requirements are SSE4 and CLMUL (carry-less multiplication), as well as UEFI.

Features 
Clear Linux OS uses reference stacks to install images that are optimized and tested together for specific use-cases. It also utilizes a strict separation between User data and System config files, called stateless, so that even a misconfigured system will still boot correctly and then perform a factory reset so it can be reconfigured.

Desktop 
By default, Clear Linux OS ships with the GNOME desktop environment, but instead of Wayland it uses X11 and most graphical effects are disabled. KDE Plasma and Xfce are also available for installation. It is possible to manually enable Wayland.

Package management 
Packages are usually installed and updated through bundles with the help of swupd, which is described as an OS-level software update program, using delta updates to minimize update size. Flatpak is also preinstalled and can be used to install and use packages.

Mixer is the tool for creating 3rd-party-bundles, which can then be installed using swupd.

Competitors 
For containers:

 Fedora CoreOS
 RancherOS
 Snappy Ubuntu Core
 VMware Project Photon OS
 SmartOS
 ResinOS
 openSUSE MicroOS
 Bare Metal Container

Name 
Clear Linux was referred to in early documentation as Clear Linux OS, later as Clear Linux* OS with a corresponding footnote acknowledging that the rights to "Linux" may be possessed by others. Clear Linux OS has been referred to, in the literature, as Clear Linux OS, Clear Linux* OS, Clear Linux OS, Clear Linux*, Clear Linux.

References

Further reading

External links 
 
 

Enterprise Linux distributions
Independent Linux distributions
Linux distributions
Rolling Release Linux distributions
X86-64 Linux distributions